Chiang Peng-lung (born 24 July 1976, in Penghu) is a Taiwanese male professional table tennis player.

Career highlights
Singles (as of August 15, 2010)
 Olympics: round of 16 (2000, 04).
 World Championships: SF  (2001).
 World Cup appearances: 6. Record: 4th (2001).
 Pro Tour winner  (3): Czech Open 1999; French Open 2000; Japan Open 2001. Runner-up  (4): Brazil Open 1999; Croatian, USA Open 2000; Croatian Open 2001.
 Pro Tour Grand Finals appearances: 4. Record: SF  (1999, 2000, 01).
 Asian Games: QF (1998, 2002, 06).
 Asian Championships: winner  (2000).
 Asian Cup: 3rd  (2006).
 Asia Top-12: 2nd  (1999)

Men's doubles
 Olympics: QF (2000).
 World Championships: SF  (2001, 07).
 Pro Tour winner  (7): Qatar, German Open 1999; Croatian, French Open 2000; Qatar, USA Open 2001; Slovenian Open 2008. Runner-up  (3): Australia, Czech Open 1999; Japan Open 2000.
 Pro Tour Grand Finals appearances: 2. Record: SF  (2000).
 Asian Games: SF  (1998, 2006).
 Asian Championships: winner  (2000); SF  (1994).

Mixed doubles
 World Championships: SF  (1997).
 Asian Games: runner-up  (1994).
 Asian Championships: QF (1996, 98).

Team
 Olympics: 7th (2008).
 World Championships: 6th (2008).
 Asian Championships: 2nd  (2000, 03).

References

External links
 
 

Living people
Olympic table tennis players of Taiwan
Table tennis players at the 1996 Summer Olympics
Table tennis players at the 2000 Summer Olympics
Table tennis players at the 2004 Summer Olympics
Table tennis players at the 2008 Summer Olympics
People from Penghu County
1976 births
Asian Games medalists in table tennis
Taiwanese male table tennis players
Table tennis players at the 1994 Asian Games
Table tennis players at the 1998 Asian Games
Table tennis players at the 2002 Asian Games
Table tennis players at the 2006 Asian Games
Medalists at the 1994 Asian Games
Medalists at the 1998 Asian Games
Medalists at the 2002 Asian Games
Medalists at the 2006 Asian Games
Asian Games silver medalists for Chinese Taipei
Asian Games bronze medalists for Chinese Taipei
Universiade medalists in table tennis
World Table Tennis Championships medalists
Universiade bronze medalists for Chinese Taipei
Medalists at the 2001 Summer Universiade
Medalists at the 2007 Summer Universiade
21st-century Taiwanese people